Diz Posht (also Romanized as Dīz Posht; also known as Dīzeh Posht) is a village in Katra Rural District, Nashta District, Tonekabon County, Mazandaran Province, Iran. At the 2006 census, its population was 106, in 28 families.

References 

Populated places in Tonekabon County